Snoddy may refer to;

The surname
 Snoddy (surname)

Other uses

 Snoddy, a short lived Scottish television sitcom which aired in 2002

Nickname
Robert Snodgrass